The Peugeot 407 is a large family car (D-segment) produced by the French automaker Peugeot, from 2004 to 2011. It was available in saloon, coupé and estate variants, with both diesel and petrol engines. The petrol engines ranged from 1.8 to 3.0 litres displacement, whereas the diesels ranged from 1.6 to 3.0 litre engines.

Sales commenced in June 2004, in France, with the rest of Europe commencing the following month. According to the website of the European Car of the Year, the 407 was one of the nominees for the award, in 2005.

The 407 was introduced in June 2004 as a replacement to the Peugeot 406, and was replaced in April 2011 by the Peugeot 508. Last Peugeot 407 was produced on July 5th 2011

Overview
The 407 was the successor to the hugely successful Peugeot 406, and was launched in The Sunday Times Motorshow Live, on May 27, 2004. The streamlined design of the car was seen as quite radical by magazines, such as Autocar, its most distinctive features being its large front grille, and the steeply raked screen pillars.

Autocar also published undisguised spy photos, on three occasions throughout 2003, and commented the rear window line of the saloon had "the similar feel to the short wheelbase of the Ferrari 250." The car was first announced, and presented to the press in Paris, in February 2004, and Groupe PSA (then known as PSA Peugeot Citroën) invested in €1.12 billion, in launching the car.

The estate, known as the Peugeot 407 SW, was launched four months after the saloon, in September 2004. The coupé was launched in July 2005, having been presented at the Frankfurt Motor Show of September 2005, and going on sale in January 2006. The annual sales of the Peugeot 407 peaked at  units in 2005, with  sales outside Europe. The coupé ended production in March 2012.

The models were given a minor facelift in August 2008, resulting in most petrol engined models being withdrawn from sale in the United Kingdom, and other countries of Europe. One model was available with AMVAR electronic suspension, that controls each wheel's damping independently, adapting the hardness of the ride every 2.5 milliseconds, to suit the driving style.

Design 
The design of the car is very curved, which brings the design of the 407 more in line with the smaller Peugeot 307's looks. It's "face" features angry looking eyes and a big mouth. These changes from the more conservative looks of previous models has both its fans and critics.

Safety

Engines

Television commercials
The first advertisement, known as "The Toys" or "Les Jouets", featured life size toy cars shown up, by the sleek newly released Peugeot 407. Directed by Philippe André, for agency BETC Euro RSCG, the advert was filmed in Sydney, Australia (we see cars crossing the Sydney Harbour Bridge). André developed twenty model cars especially for the shoot. This campaign was launched in June 2004.

The soundtrack was provided by French duo, The Film, (Guillaume Brière & Benjamin Lebeau) with their song "Can You Touch Me", an adaptation of their earlier song, "Can You Trust Me".

The next advertisement featured the same scenario of life size toy cars in Sydney, this time taking a new Peugeot 407 SW out of the city, to the beachside home. Along the way, we see old and decrepit station wagons breaking down, or suffering from image problems. The soundtrack features "(Lady) Hear Me Tonight" by the Modjo. The commercials used the slogan "Playtime is Over", which some perceived to be the retort, to the then slogan of Renault's Laguna, "Serious Playtime", which was launched in August 2002.

The slogan given at the end in Spanish was "Volvamos a hablar de automóviles", i.e. "Let's talk about cars again".

407 concept cars

The saloon version of the 407 was firstly previewed, with the name "407 Elixir", at the 2003 Frankfurt Motor Show. The "407 Silhouette" is a race car, with most design features of the current coupé. A version, almost identical, to the released coupé, was presented at the 2005 Geneva Motor Show, under the name "407 Prologue". The "407 Macarena" is the four door coupé convertible, produced by Heuliez, and was presented at the 2006 Geneva Motor Show.

Notable film appearances
The 407 sedan appeared in the comedy film Taxi 4 of 2007, and the film Taxi 5, of 2018, unlike the previous films (1, 2 and 3) which had its predecessor (the 406).

Successor
Philippe Varin, from PSA, announced in November 2010 that the successor of the Peugeot 407 would not be called the Peugeot 408, but instead the Peugeot 508, which was officially launched at the Paris Motor Show, in October 2010.

The saloon of the 508 was approximately 12 cm (5 inches) longer than the 407, and also replaced the larger Peugeot 607. The name Peugeot 408 was used for the Chinese built notchback version of the Peugeot 308, that replaced the 407 in South America.

Model car releases
The saloon of the Peugeot 407 has been produced by Majorette and Norev, while the SW was only produced by Norev.

The coupé has been produced by Norev and Welly, and the concept "407 Elixr", which was presented in the 2003 Frankfurt Motor Show, has been produced only by Norev.

Sales

References

External links

Official international 407 English website

407
Euro NCAP large family cars
Front-wheel-drive vehicles
Sedans
Station wagons
Coupés
Cars introduced in 2004
2010s cars
Touring cars